Robin Spry (October 25, 1939 – March 28, 2005) was a Canadian film director, producer and writer. He was perhaps best known for his documentary films Action: The October Crisis of 1970 and Reaction: A Portrait of a Society in Crisis about Quebec's October Crisis. His 1970 film Prologue won the BAFTA Award for Best Documentary.

Biography
Robin Spry was born in Toronto, Ontario to Canadian broadcast pioneer and Canadian Broadcasting Corporation founder Graham Spry CC, and economic historian Irene Spry OC.

After studies at Oxford University and the London School of Economics, Spry began his filmmaking career in 1964 at the National Film Board in Montreal, earning a place on its payroll in 1965. He built a reputation as a documentarian engaged with the issues of the day, with films on abortion, youth rebellion, and contemporary politics.  His 1970 film Prologue documented the riots at the 1968 Democratic National Convention in Chicago, weaving narrative with archival footage. His Canadian Film Award-winning documentary Action: The October Crisis of 1970 (1973) used a similar approach to tell the story of the kidnapping of British diplomat James Richard Cross and the murder of Pierre Laporte. While at the NFB, Spry acted as a producer, director, writer, cinematographer, film editor and actor, appearing in several colleagues' films, including Denys Arcand's Québec, Duplessis et après" (1972), in which he read sections of the 1839 Durham Report. He also starred in the 1981 hostage film Kings and Desperate Men.

In 1978, Spry left the NFB. He did some work for the CBC, then founded his own production company, Telescene Film Group Productions, through which he produced many TV movies and series. Upon its bankruptcy in 2000, he worked with the Montreal production company CinéGroupe.

The first season of his last production, Charlie Jade, was dedicated to his memory, as mentioned in the credits of the final episode, as was Air Crash Investigation's episode "Mistaken Identity".

Personal life and death
Spry was divorced from journalist Carmel Dumas; they had two children.
He died in a car crash in Montreal on March 28, 2005.

Filmography
You Don't Back Down - documentary short, Don Owen, National Film Board of Canada 1965 - writer
Miner - documentary short, National Film Board of Canada 1965 - writer and director
Level 4350 - documentary short, National Film Board of Canada 1965 - writer and director
Little White Crimes - documentary short, George Kaczender, National Film Board of Canada 1966 - writer
Illegal Abortion - documentary short, National Film Board of Canada 1966 - writer and director
Change in the Maritimes - documentary short, National Film Board of Canada 1966 - writer and director
Ride for Your Life - documentary short, National Film Board of Canada 1966 - director
Flowers on a One-Way Street - documentary, National Film Board of Canada 1967 - writer and director
Prologue - documentary, National Film Board of Canada 1967 - producer and director
Downhill - short film, National Film Board of Canada 1973 - writer, producer and director
Reaction: A Portrait of a Society in Crisis - documentary, National Film Board of Canada 1973 - producer and director
Action: The October Crisis of 1970 - documentary, National Film Board of Canada 1974, writer, producer and director
Face - short film, National Film Board of Canada 1975 - editor, cinematographer, producer and director
One Man - feature, National Film Board of Canada 1977 - writer and director
Drying Up the Streets - TV movie, CBC 1978 - director
Don’t Forget - TV movie, For the Record), CBC 1979 - director
Suzanne - feature, RSL Films 1980 - writer and director
Winnie - short film 1981 - director
To Serve the Coming Age - documentary 1983 - director
You've Come a Long Way, Ladies - TV movie, Roger Cardinal 1984 - producer
Stress and Emotion - documentary, for The Brain, WNET/PBS 1984
Keeping Track - feature, Telescene Film Group Productions 1986 - writer, producer, director 
Malarek - feature, Telescene Film Group Productions, Roger Cardinal 1988 - producer
Straight for the Heart - feature, Telescene Film Group Productions, Léa Pool 1988 - producer
Obsessed (aka Hitting Home) - TV movie, Telescene Film Group Productions 1987 - writer and producer
An Imaginary Tale - feature, Telescene Film Group Productions, André Forcier 1990 - producer
Urban Angel - TV series, Telescene Film Group Productions, Canadian Broadcasting Corporation 1991-1992 - producer
A Cry in the Night - TV movie, Telescene Film Group Productions et al - writer, producer and director 
The Myth of the Male Orgasm - feature, Telescene Film Group Productions et al, John Hamilton 1993 - producer
Witchboard III: The Possession - feature, Telescene Film Group Productions, Peter Svatek 1995 - producer
Hiroshima - docudrama, Cine Bazar & Telescene Film Group Productions, Koreyoshi Kurahara & Roger Spottiswoode 1995 - producer 
On Dangerous Ground - TV movie, Telescene Film Group Productions et al, Lawrence Gordon Clark 1996 - producer 
Windsor Protocol - TV movie, Telescene Film Group Productions & Vision View Productions, George Mihalka 1997 - producer 
Midnight Man - TV movie, Telescene Film Group Productions et al, Lawrence Gordon Clark 1997 - producer
The Hunger - TV series, Telescene Film Group Productions, 1997-2000 - producer
Student Bodies - TV series, Telescene Film Group Productions et al 1997-1999 - producer
Mario, Mike and the Great Gretzky - Video, Telescene Film Group Productions, France Corbeil 1998 - producer
Going to Kansas City - TV movie,  Telescene Film Group Productions, Pekka Mandart 1998 - producer
Escape from Wildcat Canyon - TV movie, Telescene Film Group Productions et al, Marc F. Voizard 1998 - producer
Thunder Point - TV movie, Telescene Film Group Productions & Vision View Productions, George Mihalka 1998 - producer
Nightmare Man - TV movie, Telescene Film Group Productions & Isambard Productions, Jim Kaufman 1999 - producer
Big Wolf on Campus  - TV series, Telescene Film Group Productions  CinéGroupe & Saban Entertainment 1999-2002 - producer
The Lost World - TV movie, Telescene Film Group Productions et al, Richard Franklin 1999 - producer
The Lost World  - TV series, Telescene Film Group Productions et al 1999-2001 - producer 
Live Through This - TV series, Telescene Film Group Productions et al, 2000-2001  
Dr. Jekyll and Mr. Hyde - TV movie, Telescene Film Group Productions, Colin Budds 2000 - producer 
The Lost World: Underground - Video, Telescene Film Group Productions, Colin Budds & Michael Offer 2002 - producer
Matthew Blackheart: Monster Smasher - TV movie, Telescene Film Group Productions, Érik Canuel 2002 - producer
Seriously Weird - TV series, CinéGroupe 2002-2005 - producer
Student Seduction - TV movie, CinéGroupe et al 2003 - producer
Charlie Jade - TV series, CinéGroupe 2004-2006 - producer

Awards
Flowers on a One-way Street (1967)
 Melbourne Film Festival, Melbourne, Australia:  Golden Boomerang, Special Prize for Reportage and Style, 1969
 American Film and Video Festival, New York: Blue Ribbon, 1969
 Chicago International Film Festival, Chicago: Gold Hugo for Best Television Film, Local Broadcast, 1968

Ride for Your Life (1967) 
 International Short Film Festival Oberhausen, Oberhausen, Germany: Best in Category, 1968
 Melnik Automobile Club Festival, Prague: First Prize, 1969

Prologue (1970)
 23rd British Academy Film Awards, London: BAFTA Award for Best Documentary, 1970
 Film Critics and Journalists Association of Ceylon, Colombo, Sri Lanka: First Prize

Action: The October Crisis of 1970 (1974)
 Visions du Réel, Nyon, Switzerland: Grand Prize for Best Documentary, Youth Jury 1975
 Chicago International Film Festival, Chicago: Silver Plaque, Feature Film, Documentary, 1975
 26th Canadian Film Awards, Niagara-on-the-Lake, ON: Gemini Award for Best Direction, 1975

One Man (1977)
 International Festival of Red Cross and Health Films, Varna, Bulgaria: Best Direction, 1979
 ACTRA Awards, Montreal: Film of the Year, 1978
 ACTRA Awards, Montreal: Best Writing in the Visual Medium, 1978
 Film Festival Antwerpen, Antwerp: Second Best Film of the Festival, 1978
 Film Festival Antwerpen, Antwerp: Honorable Mention by the Press Jury, 1978
 28th Canadian Film Awards, Toronto: Best Original Screenplay, 1977

Drying Up the Streets (1978)
 9th ACTRA Awards, Toronto: Best Television Program of the Year, 1980

Obsessed (1987)
 Montreal World Film Festival, Montreal: Best Canadian Film, 1988

Straight for the Heart (1988)
 Festival International du Film Francophone de Namur, Namur, Belgium: Première Magazine First Prize, 1989
 FIN Atlantic Film Festival, Halifax, Nova Scotia: Award of Excellence, 1989

An Imaginary Tale (1990)
 Montreal World Film Festival, Montreal: Most Popular Film, 1990
 Cinéfest Sudbury International Film Festival, Greater Sudbury, ON: Best Canadian Film, 1990

Hiroshima (1995)
12th Gemini Awards, Toronto: Best Dramatic TV Movie or Mini-Series, 1998
 48th Primetime Emmy Awards, Los Angeles: Nominee: Outstanding Miniseries, 1996

References

External links

CTV.ca Filmmaker Robin Spry dies in Mtl. car accident
Robin Spry - The Canadian Encyclopedia
Robin Spry - Northern Stars
Watch films by Robin Spry at NFB.ca

1939 births
2005 deaths
Anglophone Quebec people
Accidental deaths in Quebec
Alumni of the London School of Economics
Canadian film editors
Film producers from Quebec
Canadian male film actors
Film directors from Montreal
Film directors from Toronto
Male actors from Montreal
Male actors from Toronto
Road incident deaths in Canada
National Film Board of Canada people
Writers from Montreal
Writers from Toronto
20th-century Canadian screenwriters